Raymond Wilson Peck (July 3, 1874 - March 16, 1950) was a writer, lyricist, and composer. He was the president of The Lambs from 1945 to 1947.

Biography
He was born in Jackson, Mississippi on July 3, 1874.

He joined The Lambs in 1910 and served on the house committee, as the librarian, and as the recording secretary. He replaced  John L. Golden as president of The Lambs in 1945.In 1947 he was replaced by Bert Lytell. He managed the Percy Williams Home for Retired Actors and Actresses in East Islip, New York.

He died at the Percy Williams Home for Retired Actors and Actresses  in East Islip, New York on March 16, 1950.

Broadway productions
Castles in the Air (1926) book and lyrics
The Right Girl (1921) book and lyrics
The Rose Maid (1912) book
Ziegfeld Follies of 1911 additional music
A Certain Party (1911) featuring songs with lyrics by Raymond Peck
The Hoyden (1907) songs with lyrics
The Vanderbilt Cup (play) (1907) lyrics

References

External links
 

The Lambs presidents
1874 births
1950 deaths